Barkudia melanosticta commonly known as Visakhapatnam limbless skink or Russell's legless skink is a skink endemic to Vishakapatnam region of Coromandel Coast, in Andhra Pradesh state of southeastern India.  One of the foremost of Indian reptiles collected during the days of Patrick Russell in 1790s, this species' type specimen was considered lost. Later its taxonomy was fixed by redescribing recent collections dating between 1950s-80s by professors of Andhra University, Waltair from their campus, and deposited in the Zoological Survey of India in Kolkata, India (fide I. Das).

Geographic range
B. melanosticta is known only from the vicinity of its type locality - Visakhapatnam in the Indian state of Andhra Pradesh.

Description
A burrowing species, B. melanosticta has an elongated body, with no legs. The eyes are vestigial, with only lower eyelids. The ear openings are slit-like.

References

Further reading
Günther ACLG (1864). The Reptiles of British India. London: The Ray Society. (Taylor and Francis, printers). xxvii + 452 pp. + Plates I-XXVI. ("Anguis melanosticta [sic]", p. 95).
Schneider JG (1801). Historiae Amphibiorum naturalis et literariae. Fasciculus secundus continens Crocodilos, Scincos, Chamaesauras, Boas, Pseudoboas, Elapes, Angues, Amphisbaenas et Caecilias. Jena: F. Fromman. vi + 364 pp. + Plates I-II. (Anguis melanostictus, new species, pp. 323-324). (in Latin).

Barkudia
Reptiles described in 1801
Reptiles of India
Taxa named by Johann Gottlob Theaenus Schneider